(Let honour be sung to You, O God), BWV 248V (also written as BWV 248 V), is a church cantata for the second Sunday after Christmas, which Johann Sebastian Bach composed as the fifth part of his Christmas Oratorio, written for the Christmas season of 1734–35 in Leipzig. Bach was then Thomaskantor, responsible for music at four churches in Leipzig, a position he had assumed in 1723.

History 

Bach had been presenting church cantatas for the Christmas season in the Thomaskirche (St. Thomas) and Nikolaikirche (St. Nicholas) since his appointment as director musices in Leipzig in 1723, including these cantatas for the Sunday after New Year's Day:

Christmas season 1734–35 

Bach composed his Christmas Oratorio for the Christmas season from Christmas Day on 25 December 1734 to Epiphany on 6 January 1735.

Text 
The readings for the Sunday were as the epistle , the suffering of Christians, and as the Gospel , the Flight into Egypt. The text of Part V, deviating from these readings, deals with the voyage of the Magi, following the Gospel of Matthew, 1–6, with interspersed reflecting recitatives, arias and chorales.

The identity of the librettist of the Christmas Oratorio cantatas is unknown, with Picander, who had collaborated with Bach earlier, a likely candidate. The oratorio's libretto was published in 1734. The quotations from the Bible are rendered in Martin Luther's translation.

Music and content 
 is scored for 2 oboes d'amore, 2 violin parts, 1 viola part and continuo.

References

Sources
 
 
 
 
 

Church cantatas by Johann Sebastian Bach
1735 compositions